Somerset Street may refer to:

Somerset Street (New Brunswick)
Somerset Street (Ottawa)